John Wilson (30 June 1857 – 11 November 1931) was an English amateur first-class cricketer, who played in four matches for Yorkshire County Cricket Club between 1887 and 1888.

Born in Hoyland, Yorkshire, England, Wilson was a right arm slow underarm bowler, who took twelve first-class wickets at 13.75. Wilson  scored seventeen runs, as a right hand bat, with a best score of 13 not out.  He took three catches in the field.

Wilson died in November 1931, in Millhouses, Sheffield, Yorkshire, aged 74.

References

External links
Cricinfo Profile

1857 births
1931 deaths
People from Hoyland
Yorkshire cricketers
English cricketers
Cricketers from Yorkshire